Hannah Olson is an American documentary film director and producer. She is best known for her work on the HBO documentaries, Baby God and The Last Cruise.

Life and career

Olson was born in Minnetonka, Minnesota. She graduated from Hopkins High School and Brown University. In 2020, she made her directing debut with the documentary film, Baby God, about the investigation of Dr. Quincy Fortier. It premiered at South by Southwest and the Nantucket Film Festival.

Olson's second documentary film, The Last Cruise, was about the COVID-19 outbreak on the Diamond Princess. It premiered at South by Southwest.

Filmography

Awards and nominations

References

External links
 

Living people
American women documentary filmmakers
American documentary film directors
American documentary film producers
Year of birth missing (living people)